The Fokker M.6 was a two-seat experimental design resembling the later E.I fighter. It had a 60 kW (80 hp) Oberursel engine and first flew in June 1914.

M.6
1910s German experimental aircraft
Shoulder-wing aircraft
Single-engined tractor aircraft
Aircraft first flown in 1914